The Croatian League of American Football is a national american football competition in Croatia that was first held in 2008 by the Croatian Federation of American Football.

Teams
Bjelovar Greenhorns
Split Sea Wolves
Zagreb Patriots
Zaprešić Saints

Former teams
Dubrovnik Sharks
Osijek Cannons
Teutoburgium Pitbulls
Zagreb Thunder
Zagreb Raiders

CroBowl Winners

References

External links
The Official Website of the Croatian Federation of American Football

American football leagues in Europe
Sports leagues established in 2010
Amer
2010 establishments in Croatia